Lieutenant General Torsten Reinhold Engberg (28May 1934 – 7February 2018) was a senior Swedish Coastal Artillery officer. Engberg was Chief of the Naval Staff from 1984 to 1987 and Chief of the Defence Staff from 1987 to 1991 as well as military commander of the Middle Military District (Milo M) from 1991 to 1994. He also served as the first director general of the Swedish Fortifications Agency from 1994 to 1999.

Early life
Engberg was born on 28 May 1934 in Norrfjärden Parish, Norrbotten County, Sweden, the son of Amandus Engberg and his wife Märta (née Johansson). He passed studentexamen in 1957. He was selected for conscription in Norrbotten Regiment (I 19) in Boden but wanted to join the Swedish Coastal Artillery and began his training in Karlskrona Coastal Artillery Regiment (KA 2) in Karlskrona.

Career
Engberg graduated from the Royal Swedish Naval Academy in 1959 and was commissioned as an officer the same year and was assigned as a second lieutenant to Vaxholm Coastal Artillery Regiment (KA 1). There, he participated early on in rasing the new light missile units. Engberg served in the Naval Staff from 1964 to 1965 and attended the Swedish Armed Forces Staff College from 1966 to 1968. He served in the Defence Staff in 1968 and the year after he served in the staff of the Eastern Military District (Milo Ö). On 1 October 1971, Engberg was promoted to major and served in the Defence Staff and the year after he was promoted to lieutenant colonel. He then served as commanding officer of the Coastal Ranger School in Vaxholm from 1974 to 1976. He was deputy section chief in the Defence Staff from 1976 to 1980 and in 1979 he underwent a course for senior unit commanders in the planning and implementation of amphibious operations at the Naval Amphibious School in United States.

Engberg was promoted to colonel and appointed commanding officer of the Gotland Coastal Artillery Defence (KA 3) on 1 October 1980. He was promoted to senior colonel in 1982 and was appointed Chief of Staff of the Western Military District (Milo V) in Skövde. In 1984, Engberg attended the Naval Postgraduate School in the United States and back in Sweden he was appointed Chief of the Naval Staff and promoted to major general on 1 April 1984. On 1 April 1987, Engberg was promoted to lieutenant general and appointed Chief of the Defence Staff. On 1 July 1991, Engberg was appointed military commander of the Middle Military District (Milo M). At the same time he served as the Commandant General in Stockholm. He served in this position until 1994. He then served as the first director general of the Swedish Fortifications Agency from 1 July 1994 to 1999. The agency was undergoing reorganization and received new tasks both for the Swedish Armed Forces and abroad, among other things he led the creation of protected, underground oil storage facilities in countries in the Middle East where the experience from the Swedish Total Defence came in handy.

Personal life
In 1962, Engberg married Gun Zander (born 1941), the daughter of Hjalmar Zander and Elizabeth (née Persson). They had two children: Anna and Henrik.

Death
Engberg died on 7 February 2018 in Simrishamn.

Dates of rank
1959 – Second lieutenant
19?? – Lieutenant
19?? – Captain
1 October 1971 – Major
1972 – Lieutenant colonel
1 October 1980 – Colonel
1982 – Senior colonel
1 April 1984 – Major general
1 April 1987 – Lieutenant general

Awards and decorations
  Grand Cross of the Royal Norwegian Order of Merit (1 July 1992)

Honours
Member of the Royal Swedish Academy of War Sciences
Member of the Royal Swedish Society of Naval Sciences (1979)

References

1934 births
2018 deaths
Swedish Coastal Artillery lieutenant generals
People from Piteå Municipality
20th-century Swedish military personnel
Members of the Royal Swedish Academy of War Sciences
Members of the Royal Swedish Society of Naval Sciences
Naval Postgraduate School alumni
Chiefs of the Defence Staff (Sweden)